Below are the results of season 18 of the World Poker Tour (2019–21). There were 29 scheduled events.

As a result of the COVID-19 pandemic, several events on the schedule were postponed. In addition, three final tables that were supposed to take place at the HyperX Esports Arena at the Luxor Hotel & Casino in Las Vegas were also delayed.

In January 2021, the WPT returned with the WPT Lucky Hearts Poker Open, the first live event since March 2020. The three final tables that were delayed were played in either March or May, more than a year after the lineup was set.

The Seminole Hard Rock Poker Showdown, the final event on the schedule, set a new record for the largest WPT event with 2,482 entrants.

Events

Source:

Gardens Poker Festival 

 Casino: The Gardens Casino, Hawaiian Gardens, California
 Buy-in: $5,000
 6-Day Event: July 20–25, 2019
 Number of Entries: 373
 Total Prize Pool: $1,753,100
 Number of Payouts: 48

Legends of Poker 

 Casino: The Bicycle Hotel & Casino, Bell Gardens, California
 Buy-in: $5,000
 5-Day Event: August 31-September 4, 2019
 Number of Entries: 520
 Total Prize Pool: $2,392,000
 Number of Payouts: 65

Borgata Poker Open

 Casino: Borgata Hotel Casino & Spa, Atlantic City, New Jersey
 Buy-in: $3,500
 6-Day Event: September 15–20, 2019
 Number of Entries: 1,156
 Total Prize Pool: $3,700,356
 Number of Payouts: 145

WPT Maryland at Live! Casino 

 Casino: Live! Casino & Hotel, Hanover, Maryland
 Buy-in: $3,500
 5-Day Event: September 28-October 2, 2019
 Number of Entries: 495
 Total Prize Pool: $1,584,000
 Number of Payouts: 62

WPT UK 

 Casino: Dusk Till Dawn Poker & Casino, Nottingham, England
 Buy-in: $3,300
 5-Day Event: October 2–6, 2019
 Number of Entries: 690
 Total Prize Pool: $2,007,900
 Number of Payouts: 100

bestbet Bounty Scramble 

 Casino: bestjet Jacksonville, Jacksonville, Florida
 Buy-in: $5,000
 5-Day Event: October 11–15, 2019
 Number of Entries: 349
 Total Prize Pool: $1,615,870
 Number of Payouts: 45

WPT Montreal 

 Casino: Playground Poker Club, Kahnawake, Quebec
 Buy-in: $3,300
 6-Day Event: October 29-November 3, 2019
 Number of Entries: 1,109
 Total Prize Pool: $3,327,000
 Number of Payouts: 159

Seminole Rock 'N' Roll Poker Open 

 Casino: Seminole Hard Rock Hotel & Casino, Hollywood, Florida
 Buy-in: $3,500
 6-Day Event: November 29-December 4, 2019
 Number of Entries: 988
 Total Prize Pool: $3,161,600
 Number of Payouts: 124

Five Diamond World Poker Classic 

 Casino: Bellagio Resort & Casino, Las Vegas, Nevada
 Buy-in: $10,400
 5-Day Event: December 16–21, 2019
 Number of Entries: 1,035
 Total Prize Pool: $10,039,500
 Number of Payouts: 130

Gardens Poker Championship 

 Casino: The Gardens Casino, Hawaiian Gardens, California
 Buy-in: $10,000
 5-Day Event: January 9-13, 2020 (Final Table: March 10, 2021)
 Number of Entries: 257
 Total Prize Pool: $2,467,200
 Number of Payouts: 33

Lucky Hearts Poker Open 

 Casino: Seminole Hard Rock Hotel & Casino, Hollywood, Florida
 Buy-in: $3,500
 6-Day Event: January 17–22, 2020
 Number of Entries: 843
 Total Prize Pool: $2,697,600
 Number of Payouts: 106
 Note: Altman becomes the first player to win the same WPT event twice.

WPT Russia 

 Casino: Casino Sochi, Sochi, Russia
 Buy-in: RUB 210,000
 6-Day Event: January 21–26, 2020
 Number of Entries: 489
 Total Prize Pool: RUB 95,500,000
 Number of Payouts: 71

Borgata Winter Poker Open 

 Casino: Borgata Hotel Casino & Spa, Atlantic City, New Jersey
 Buy-in: $3,500
 5-Day Event: January 26–30, 2020 (Final Table: May 16, 2021)
 Number of Entries: 1,290
 Total Prize Pool: $4,129,290
 Number of Payouts: 162

WPT Germany 

 Casino: King's Resort, Rozvadov, Czech Republic
 Buy-in: €3,300
 6-Day Event: February 18–23, 2020
 Number of Entries: 510
 Total Prize Pool: €1,453,500
 Number of Payouts: 73

Fallsview Poker Classic 

 Casino: Fallsview Casino Resort, Niagara Falls, Ontario
 Buy-in: $5,000
 3-Day Event: February 21–23, 2020
 Number of Entries: 594
 Total Prize Pool: $2,708,046
 Number of Payouts: 75

L.A. Poker Classic 

 Casino: The Commerce Hotel & Casino, Commerce, California
 Buy-in: $10,000
 5-Day Event: February 29-March 4, 2020 (Final Table: May 17, 2021)
 Number of Entries: 490
 Total Prize Pool: $4,727,550
 Number of Payouts: 62

WPT Rolling Thunder 

 Casino: Thunder Valley Casino Resort, Lincoln, California
 Buy-in: $5,000
 4-Day Event: March 7-10, 2020
 Number of Entries: 250
 Total Prize Pool: $1,162,500
 Number of Payouts: 32

WPT Online Championship 

 Casino: Online (partypoker)
 Buy-in: $3,200
 7-Day Event: May 10–20, 2020
 Number of Entries: 2,130
 Total Prize Pool: $6,390,000
 Number of Payouts: 312

World Championship 8-Max by partypoker 

 Casino: Online (partypoker)
 Buy-in: $3,200
 4-Day Event: August 1–4, 2020
 Number of Entries: 1,062
 Total Prize Pool: $3,186,000
 Number of Payouts: 136

World Championship 6-Max by partypoker 

 Casino: Online (partypoker)
 Buy-in: $3,200
 4-Day Event: August 8-11, 2020
 Number of Entries: 999
 Total Prize Pool: $3,000,000
 Number of Payouts: 120

World Championship Knockout by partypoker 

 Casino: Online (partypoker)
 Buy-in: $3,200
 4-Day Event: August 15–18, 2020
 Number of Entries: 1,035
 Total Prize Pool: $3,105,000
 Number of Payouts: 136

World Championship Mix-Max by partypoker 

 Casino: Online (partypoker)
 Buy-in: $3,200
 4-Day Event: August 22–25, 2020
 Number of Entries: 989
 Total Prize Pool: $3,000,000
 Number of Payouts: 132

WPT World Championship Main Event 

 Casino: Online (partypoker)
 Buy-in: $10,300
 11-Day Event: September 6-16, 2020
 Number of Entries: 1,011
 Total Prize Pool: $10,110,000
 Number of Payouts: 136

WPT Online Poker Open 

 Casino: Online (partypoker US Network)
 Buy-in: $3,500
 3-Day Event: December 27–29, 2020
 Number of Entries: 395
 Total Prize Pool: $1,264,000
 Number of Payouts: 64

WPT Montreal Online 

 Casino: Online (partypoker)
 Buy-in: $3,200
 5-Day Event: January 17–27, 2021
 Number of Entries: 888
 Total Prize Pool: $2,664,000
 Number of Payouts: 133

WPT Lucky Hearts Poker Open 

 Casino: Seminole Hard Rock Hotel & Casino, Hollywood, Florida
 Buy-in: $3,500
 5-Day Event: January 22–26, 2021
 Number of Entries: 1,573
 Total Prize Pool: $5,033,600
 Number of Payouts: 197

WPT Russia 

 Casino: Casino Sochi, Sochi, Russia
 Buy-in: 245,000 RUB
 6-Day Event: February 23–28, 2021
 Number of Entries: 251
 Total Prize Pool: $
 Number of Payouts: 118

WPT at Venetian 

 Casino: The Venetian Resort, Las Vegas, Nevada
 Buy-in: $5,000
 5-Day Event: March 5–9, 2021
 Number of Entries: 937
 Total Prize Pool: $4,333,625
 Number of Payouts: 118

Seminole Hard Rock Poker Showdown 

 Casino: Seminole Hard Rock Hotel & Casino, Hollywood, Florida
 Buy-in: $3,500
 5-Day Event: April 23-27, 2021 (Final Table: May 18)
 Number of Entries: 2,482
 Total Prize Pool: $7,942,000
 Number of Payouts: 311
 Note: Established a new record for largest WPT event

Player of the Year

Source:

External links
Official site

References

World Poker Tour
2019 in poker
2020 in poker
2021 in poker